R-4066 (Spirodone) is a drug which is an analogue of the opioid analgesic methadone, or more accurately norpipanone, where the metabolically labile dimethylamino group has been replaced by a piperidinospiro group. Developed by Janssen Pharmaceutica, it is around 212x more potent than methadone as an analgesic in animal tests, with an effective oral dosage of 0.07 mg/kg, but is shorter acting, with a duration of action of around 3 hours. If the ketone function is reduced and acetylated, the racemate 106 x methadone and has an analgesic duration of 20.5 hours compared to 8 hours for methadone.

R-4066 has never been used in humans, but would be expected to produce effects similar to those of other potent opioid agonists, including strong analgesia, sedation, euphoria, constipation, itching and respiratory depression which could be harmful or fatal.

References 

Opioids
Ketones
Nitrogen heterocycles
Mu-opioid receptor agonists
Spiro compounds
Abandoned drugs

Belgian inventions